Gasht or Gosht or Gesht may refer to:
 Gasht, Gilan
 Gasht-e Gurab, Gilan Province
 Gasht-e Rudkhan, Gilan Province
 Gosht, Iran
 Gasht Rural District (disambiguation)